Wonderla is the largest chain of amusement parks in India. It is owned and operated by Wonderla Holidays Limited which is headquartered near Bidadi,  from Bangalore, Karnataka. It operates 3 amusement parks in Kochi, Bangalore, and Hyderabad.

Wonderla is promoted by Kochouseph Chittilappilly and his son Arun Chittilappilly. The first amusement park project Wonderla Kochi was set up in 2000, followed by the second in Bangalore in 2005, and finally the third in Hyderabad was commissioned in April 2016. Wonderla is currently planning to open its 4th amusement park in Chennai. Wonderla amusement parks offer a variety of dry rides such as roller coasters, ferris wheels, drop towers and water rides for its customers.

History 
In the year 2000, Kochouseph Chittilappilly started the flagship amusement water theme park under the name Veegaland in Kochi, Kerala. 75 crore INRs was invested in the construction and development of Veegaland. A third amusement park, Wonderla Hyderabad, was commissioned in April 2016. Currently the company is run by Arun Chittiplappilly as managing director.

Locations

Kochi

The Kochi park was re-branded in 2011. This park is situated on the top of a hill at Pallikkara, 12 kilometres (7.5 mi) from the city center. The park was set up in 2000 and was designed by architect Joseph John.

Wonderla Kochi is the first park in India to get ISO 14001 certificate for eco-friendliness and OHSAS 18001 certificate for safety. The park is spread over 30 acres of landscaped space with more than 60 amusement rides. In July 2018, Wonderla Kochi was ranked eleventh in the TripAdvisor 'Travellers' choice awards for amusement parks and water parks in Asia.

Bangalore
The park features a wide variety of attractions including 55 land and water rides, a musical fountain, laser shows, and a virtual reality show. Wonderla Bangalore has a full-fledged dance floor with a twist, electronically controlled rain showers. Wonderla also has attractions specially designed for children, and these are gentle yet unusual like a kiddies free fall ride. It uses solar-heated water for all its pools during winter. It has conference facilities for up to 1,000 persons and features five restaurants with a total seating capacity of 1,150. It has locker rooms with over 2,350 lockers and restrooms and showers. Wonderla Bangalore has been ranked 1st in India and 7th best in Asia by Tripadvisor for 2014, the highest for any Amusement park in India.

Wonderla Holidays opened its first luxury resort, an 84-room hotel complex spread over 100,000 square feet and operational since 2012. The resort features a dedicated children's play area as well as recreational and conferencing facilities. The resort is located next to Wonderla Bangalore.

Hyderabad
Wonderla Hyderabad offers 28 land-based rides and 18 water-based attractions on 50 acres of land. Wonderla Amusement Park is 28 kms from Hyderabad City. Its most notable ride is Recoil, a reverse looping roller coaster. It was launched on January 20, 2018 by Managing Director Arun K Chittilappilly and chief executive officer DS Sachdeva.

IPO
The initial public offering (IPO) of Wonderla Holidays for about Rs 180 crores received overwhelming response. The IPO proceeds were to be used for its upcoming theme park project in Hyderabad.

Upcoming Park
Wonderla Holidays will set up an amusement park on the outskirts of Bhubaneswar. The property will be developed as one of the biggest parks in the country on a 50-acre patch of land at an investment of 115 crore. The company has signed an agreement with the State government for leasing of land for a period of 90 years for the amusement park on an asset-light business model at Kumarbasta village in Khurda district.

The proposed park will be a compact one compared to others owned by the company and is expected to be operational within two years. Managing Director of Wonderla Holidays Arun K Chittilappilly said the company has decided to develop the facility following an invitation by Odisha government to set up an amusement park in Bhubaneswar.

Expansion plans
Wonderla holidays is currently working on its 4th amusement park in Chennai and the park awaiting final approval from the Chennai Department of Town & Country Planning to commence its project.

References

External links

Amusement parks in Karnataka
Tourist attractions in Bangalore
2000 establishments in Kerala
Buildings and structures in Bangalore
Amusement parks in Kerala
Buildings and structures in Kochi
Amusement parks in Hyderabad, India
Tourist attractions in Hyderabad, India
Tourist attractions in Telangana